Gastrochilus intermedius is a species of orchid growing in China (South East Sichuan), North East India, Thailand and Vietnam.

References 

intermedius
Orchids of Sichuan
Orchids of India
Orchids of Thailand
Orchids of Vietnam